Frejon (From Feijão, which is the Portuguese word for beans) is a coconut milk and bean soup which is eaten especially during Holy Week by a selection of Christians, mostly Catholics, across the world. Countries where Frejon is popular include Brazil and Nigeria (especially among Yoruba who returned to Nigeria from Brazil at the abolition of the slave trade, and settled in what is known as the "Brazilian Quarters" in Lagos Island), and also Sierra Leone on Good Friday, or for functions such as weddings. Because dairy foods and flesh meat (beef, pork, goat) are strictly forbidden on Good Friday, this dish is a suitable accompaniment to non-dairy foods such as fried fish and peppered snail.

The frejons consumed in Nigeria and West Africa are puddings made of black beans cooked slowly overnight over a wood or charcoal fire, and then mixed with coconut milk to form a thick, sweet, smooth pudding.   In certain countries, the dish is flavored with cocoa. Frejon is often served with fish stew, peppered snail and Garri Ijebu.

Other variations

 Pepper, crayfish, salt and tomatoes can be added to the mashed beans and coconut mixture.
 Sweet frejon may also be achieved by adding sugar. It may also be chilled until it hardens, or thinned to make a drink which is served with biscuits.

See also

 List of African dishes
 List of bean soups
 List of soups

References

Frejon

Brazilian cuisine
Foods containing coconut
Nigerian cuisine
Yoruba cuisine
Legume dishes
Wedding food
Puddings